Ivo Vazgeč (born 6 February 1986) is a Bosnian-born Swedish retired football goalkeeper of Bosnian Croat heritage.

Career
Vazgeč joined the Polish team Śląsk Wrocław in 2009 from IFK Norrköping. He played one game for the Swedish U21 national football team in 2006.

External links
 
 
 
 

1986 births
Living people
People from Kakanj
Bosnia and Herzegovina emigrants to Sweden
Swedish people of Croatian descent
Association football goalkeepers
Swedish footballers
Sweden under-21 international footballers
Jönköpings Södra IF players
Athlitiki Enosi Larissa F.C. players
AaB Fodbold players
Assyriska FF players
IFK Norrköping players
Śląsk Wrocław players
Landskrona BoIS players
IF Brommapojkarna players
Ljungskile SK players
Husqvarna FF players
Assyriska IK players
Allsvenskan players
Superettan players
Ettan Fotboll players
Ekstraklasa players
Swedish expatriate footballers
Expatriate footballers in Greece
Swedish expatriate sportspeople in Greece
Expatriate men's footballers in Denmark
Swedish expatriate sportspeople in Denmark
Expatriate footballers in Poland
Swedish expatriate sportspeople in Poland